The knockout stage of the 1999 FIFA Women's World Cup was the second and final stage of the competition, following the group stage. It began on June 30 with the quarter-finals and ended on July 10, 1999, with the final match, held at the Rose Bowl in Pasadena. A total of eight teams (the top two teams from each group) advanced to the knockout stage to compete in a single-elimination style tournament.

All times listed are local time.

Format
In all knockout matches apart from the third-place play-off, if a match was level at the end of 90 minutes of normal playing time, extra time was played (two periods of 15 minutes each). If still tied after extra time, the match was decided by a penalty shoot-out to determine the winner. If the third-place play-off was level at the end of 90 minutes of normal playing time, no extra time would be played, and the match would immediately be decided by a penalty shoot-out.

Qualified teams
The top two placed teams from each of the four groups qualified for the knockout stage.

Bracket

Quarter-finals

China PR vs Russia

Norway vs Sweden

United States vs Germany

Brazil vs Nigeria

Semi-finals

United States vs Brazil

Norway vs China PR

Third place play-off

Final

References

External links
FIFA Women's World Cup USA 1999 at FIFA.com

1999 FIFA Women's World Cup
1999
Brazil at the 1999 FIFA Women's World Cup
China at the 1999 FIFA Women's World Cup
Germany at the 1999 FIFA Women's World Cup
Nigeria at the 1999 FIFA Women's World Cup
Norway at the 1999 FIFA Women's World Cup
Russia at the 1999 FIFA Women's World Cup
Sweden at the 1999 FIFA Women's World Cup
United States at the 1999 FIFA Women's World Cup